Foul may refer to:


In sports
 Foul (sports), an unfair or illegal act during a sports competition, including:
 Foul (association football), in football (soccer)
 Professional foul, in football (soccer) or rugby
 Foul (basketball)
 Foul ball, in baseball, a batted ball that lands in foul territory
 Foul (fanzine), a 1970s British football fanzine

Other uses
 Foul (nautical), to entangle or entwine
 Lord Foul, the villain of The Chronicles of Thomas Covenant, a fantasy novel series by Stephen R. Donaldson
 Ful medames, a fava bean stew

See also
 Foul Bay (disambiguation)
 Foul Point, Coronation Island, South Orkney Islands
 Foul play (disambiguation)
 Fouling, in engineering, accumulation of unwanted deposits on solid surfaces
 Fowl (disambiguation)